Levitsky is a surname. Notable people with the surname include:

 Fred Momotenko-Levitsky (born 1970), Dutch composer
 Grigory Andreevich Levitsky (1878–1942), Russian and Soviet plant cytogeneticist
 Maxym Levitsky (born 1972), Ukrainian footballer
 Melvyn Levitsky (born 1938), American diplomat
 Mykhajlo Levitsky (1774–1858), Ukrainian archbishop
 Rafail Levitsky (1847–1940), Russian artist
 Sergey Levitsky (1819–1898), Russian photographer 
 Stepan Levitsky (1876–1924), Russian chess master
 Steven Levitsky (born 1968), American political scientist

See also
 Levitzky

East Slavic-language surnames
Slavic-language surnames
Levite surnames
Jewish surnames
Yiddish-language surnames